Theodore Dwight Weld (November 23, 1803 – February 3, 1895) was one of the architects of the American abolitionist movement during its formative years from 1830 to 1844, playing a role as writer, editor, speaker, and organizer. He is best known for his co-authorship of the authoritative compendium American Slavery As It Is: Testimony of a Thousand Witnesses, published in 1839. Harriet Beecher Stowe partly based Uncle Tom’s Cabin on Weld's text; the latter is regarded as second only to the former in its influence on the antislavery movement. Weld remained dedicated to the abolitionist movement until slavery was ended by the Thirteenth Amendment to the United States Constitution in 1865.

According to Lyman Beecher, the father of Harriet Beecher Stowe, Weld was "as eloquent as an angel, and as powerful as thunder." His words were "logic on fire".

Weld "is totally unknown to most Americans".

Early life
Born in Hampton, Connecticut, the son and grandson of Congregational ministers, at age 14 Weld took over his father's  farm near Hartford, Connecticut, to earn money to study at Phillips Academy in Andover, Massachusetts, attending from 1820 to 1822, when failing eyesight caused him to leave. After a doctor urged him to travel, he started an itinerant lecture series on mnemonics, traveling for three years throughout the United States, including the South, where he saw slavery first-hand. In 1825 Weld moved with his family to Pompey, in upstate New York.

College education
Weld then studied at Hamilton College in Clinton, Oneida County, New York. The famous evangelist Charles Finney was based in Oneida County, and while a student Weld must have attended some of Finney's many revivals, for he became Finney's disciple. In Utica, intellectual capital of western New York, center of abolitionism, and county seat of Oneida County, he met and became a good friend of Charles Stuart, an early abolitionist, who at that time (1822–1829) was head of the Utica Academy. They spent several years as members of Finney's "holy band" before he decided to become a preacher and in 1827 entered the Oneida Institute of Science and Industry in Whitesboro, New York, after first staying at the farmhouse of founder George Washington Gale in Western, New York, working in exchange for instruction. While at the Oneida Institute, he would spend two weeks at a time traveling about lecturing on the virtues of manual labor, temperance, and moral reform. "Weld...had both the stamina and charisma to hold listeners spellbound for three hours." As a result, by 1831 he had become a "well known citizen" of Oneida County, according to a letter of Joseph Swan published in the Utica Elucidator.

Weld was described thus by James Fairchild, who knew him from when they were students together at Oberlin (of which Fairchild would later be President):

In an editorial comment in The Liberator, presumably by its editor Garrison, "Weld is destined to be one of the great men not of America merely, but of the world. His mind is full of strength, proportion, beauty, and majesty. ...[In his writing] there is indubitable evidence of intellectual grandeur and moral power."

In his reminiscences of that period Dr. Beecher observed: 

In a completely different forum, William Garrison said that in a convention of antislavery "agents", who travelled from town to town giving abolitionist lectures and setting up new local anti-slavery societies, "Weld was the central luminary around which they all revolved".

His future wife Angelina Grimké said in 1836, when she first laid eyes on him and heard him speak for two hours on "What is slavery?", that "I never heard so grand & beautiful an exposition of the dignity & nobility of man in my life".

Manual labor and education agent
His reputation as a speaker had reached New York, and in 1831, at the age of 28, Weld was called there by the philanthropists Lewis and Arthur Tappan. He declined their offer of a ministerial position, saying he felt himself unprepared. Since he was "a living, breathing, and eloquently-speaking exhibit of the results of manual-labor-with-study," the brothers then created, so as to employ Weld, the Society for Promoting Manual Labor in Literary Institutions [non-religious schools], which promptly hired him as its "general agent" and sent him on a factfinding and speaking tour. (The Society never carried out any activities except hiring Weld, hosting some of his lectures, and publishing his report.)

Weld carried out this commission during the calendar year 1832. His 100-page report on his activities, accompanied by 20 pages of letters received, is dated January 10, 1833. It received a review of 21 pages in the Quarterly Christian Spectator, and an abridgement was soon published.

In it he states that "In prosecuting the business of my agency, I have traveled during the year four thousand five hundred and seventy-five miles [7,364 km]; in public conveyances [boat and stagecoach], 2,630 [4,230 km]; on horseback, 1,800 [2,900 km]; on foot, 145 [233 km]. I have made two hundred and thirty-six public addresses." He was nearly killed when a high river swept away the coach he was in.

During his year as a manual labor agent, Weld scouted land, found the location for, and recruited the faculty for the Lane Theological Seminary, in Cincinnati. He enrolled there as a student in 1833, although he was informally the head, to the point of telling the trustees whom to hire. He had this power because on his recommendation the Tappans' subventions would continue, or go elsewhere (as they soon did, to Oberlin).

Abolitionist

Some of his travel was in slave states. What he saw there, together with what he read in Garrison's newspaper The Liberator (1831) and book Thoughts on African Colonization (1832), turned him into a committed abolitionist. He first worked, in 1833, at convincing the other students at Lane that immediatism, ending slavery completely and immediately, was the only solution and what God wanted. Successful, he next, with the Tappans' connivance, sought to bring immediatism to a larger audience. He announced that the public was invited to a series of public debates, over 18 evenings in February 1834, on abolition versus colonization. In fact, the debates were not debates at all, as no one spoke in favor of colonization. They were instead presentations of the horrors of American slavery, together with an exposé of the inadequacy of the American Colonization Society's project of helping free blacks migrate to Africa and its intent to preserve, rather than eliminate, slavery. At the end, the audience's views were highly supportive of immediate abolition.

The debates were then local events. However, during the Seminary's summer vacation of 1834, some of the students started teaching classes for, and in other ways working to help, the 1500 free African Americans of Cincinnati, with whom the students mixed freely. Given the pro-slavery sentiment in Cincinnati, many found his behavior unacceptable. After rumored threats of violence against the Seminary, the trustees passed rules abolishing the seminary's colonization and abolition societies and forbidding any further discussion of slavery, even at mealtimes. Weld was threatened with expulsion. A professor was fired. What happened was the mass resignation of almost all of Lane's student body, along with a sympathetic trustee, Asa Mahan. Later known as the Lane Rebels, they enrolled at the new Oberlin Collegiate Institute, insisting as conditions of their enrollment that they be free to discuss any topic (academic freedom), that Oberlin admit blacks on the same basis as whites, and that the trustees not be able to fire faculty for any or no reason. The fired professor was hired by Oberlin, and Mahan became its first president.

Weld declined an appointment at Oberlin as professor of theology, directing Shipperd to Charles Finney. Instead, he took a position as agent of the American Anti-Slavery Society for Ohio. "He has, with characteristic disinterestedness, accepted this agency at one half the salary he was offered by another institution."

Anti-slavery activity
Starting in 1834, Weld was an agent for the American Anti-Slavery Society, recruiting and training people to work for the cause, making converts of James G. Birney, Harriet Beecher Stowe, and Henry Ward Beecher. Weld became one of the leaders of the antislavery movement, working with the Tappan brothers, New York philanthropists James G. Birney and Gamaliel Bailey, and the Grimké sisters.

In 1836, Weld discontinued lecturing when he lost his voice, and was appointed editor of its books and pamphlets by the American Anti-Slavery Society.  In 1836–1840 Weld worked as the editor of The Emancipator.

In 1838, Weld married Angelina Grimké; see The abolitionist Weld–Grimké wedding. He was a strong abolitionist and women's rights advocate; at the marriage there were two ministers, one white and one black. He renounced any power or legal authority over his wife, other than that produced by love. Two former slaves of the Grimkés' father were among the guests.

He then retired to a farm in Belleville, New Jersey, where he, his wife, and her sister co-wrote the very influential 1839 book American Slavery as It Is: Testimony of a Thousand Witnesses. Angelina's unmarried older sister Sarah resided with them for many years.

In June 1840 the World Anti-Slavery Convention in London denied seats to Lucretia Mott and other women, mobilizing them to fight for women's rights. This led to a split in  the U.S. abolitionist movement between the nonviolent (but wanting it immediately) "moral suasion" of William Lloyd Garrison and his American Anti-Slavery Society, which linked abolition with women's rights, and Weld, the Tappan brothers and other "pragmatic" (gradualist) abolitionists, who formed the American and Foreign Anti-Slavery Society (AFASS) and entered politics through the anti-slavery Liberty Party (ancestor of the Free-Soil Party and Republican Party), founded by James Birney, their U.S. presidential candidate in 1840 and 1844, who also founded the National Anti-Slavery Society.

In 1841–1843, Weld relocated to Washington, D.C., to direct the national campaign for sending antislavery petitions to Congress. He assisted John Quincy Adams when Congress tried him for reading petitions in violation of the gag rule, which stated that slavery could not be discussed in Congress.

Having demonstrated the value of an antislavery lobby in Washington, Weld returned to private life, where he and his wife spent the remainder of their lives directing schools and teaching in New Jersey and Massachusetts.

According to the Columbia Encyclopedia:

Many historians regard Weld as the most important figure in the abolitionist movement, surpassing even Garrison, but his passion for anonymity long made him an unknown figure in American history.

Schools
In 1854, Weld established a school of the Raritan Bay Union at Eagleswood in Perth Amboy, New Jersey. The school accepted students of all races and sexes. In 1864 he moved to Hyde Park, Massachusetts, where he helped open another school, this one in Lexington, Massachusetts, dedicated to the same principles. Here, Weld had "charge of Conversation, Composition, and English Literature."

Family

Weld was the son of Ludovicus Weld and Elizabeth Clark Weld. His brother Ezra Greenleaf Weld, a famous daguerreotype photographer, was also involved with the abolitionist movement.

A member of the Weld family of New England, Weld shares a common ancestry with Bill  Weld, Tuesday Weld, and others. This branch of the family never achieved the wealth of their Boston-based kin.

Weld died at his home in Hyde Park, Massachusetts on February 3, 1895.

Writings
 
 
 
  Weld received a published reply.
 American Slavery as It Is: Testimony of a Thousand Witnesses (with the Grimké sisters; 1839)
  An excerpt, "Slavery a System of Inherent Cruelty", appeared on pp. 127–140 of the Boston, 1850, edition of the  [https://archive.org/details/narrativeofsojou1850gilb/page/126 Narrative of Sojourner Truth : a northern slave, emancipated from bodily servitude by the state of New York, in 1828 : with a portrait.]
 

Archival material
Papers of Weld and the Grimké sisters are at the Clements Library, University of Michigan, Ann Arbor, Michigan.

Additional letters were published in the two volume set "Letters of Theodore Dwight Weld, Angelina Grimké Weld and Sarah Grimke 1822-1844" published by The American Historical Association/Albert J. Beveridge Memorial Fund and held in the Hampton Room special collections at the Northampton Forbes Library, Smith College, Northampton, Massachusetts.

The original letters were held at the time of publication by Dr. L.D.H. Weld, Smith Collection at Syracuse University, Garrison collection at the Boston Public Library, Oberlin College, the Archaeological and Historical Society of Ohio, and in the James Gillespie Birney and Weld collections at the Library of Congress 

Legacy
Another Lane Rebel, Huntington Lyman, named his son Theodore Weld Lyman (born 1840) for Weld.

See also
 Fugitive Slave Convention

References
Notes

Further reading
 Letters of Theodore Dwight Weld, Angelina Grimké and Sarah Grimké, 1822–1844: Vols. 1 & 2. .
 Robert H. Abzug, Passionate Liberator: Theodore Dwight Weld & the Dilemma of Reform. New York: Oxford University Press, 1980. .
 Gilbert Hobbs Barnes. The Anti-Slavery Impulse, 1830–1844''. With an Introduction by William G. McLoughlin. New York: Harcourt, 1964.

External links
 
 

 Columbia 2003 Encyclopedia Article
 Theodore Weld: Crusader for Freedom (without footnotes)

1803 births
1895 deaths
People from Hampton, Connecticut
American abolitionists
Phillips Academy alumni
Lane Theological Seminary alumni
Oberlin College alumni
Writers from Cincinnati
Hamilton College (New York) alumni
Activists from Ohio
Oneida Institute alumni
American manual labor schools
Grimké family
Lane Rebels
People from Hyde Park, Boston
American Anti-Slavery Society
American temperance activists
People from Perth Amboy, New Jersey